The 2001–02 Notre Dame Fighting Irish men's basketball team represented the University of Notre Dame during the 2001–02 NCAA Division I men's basketball season. As a 8 seed, the Fighting Irish defeated the 9 seed Charlotte in the first round, 82–63. Notre Dame would fall to Duke in the second round.

Schedule

|-
!colspan=9 style=| Regular season

|-
!colspan=12 style=| Big East tournament
|-

|-
!colspan=12 style=| NCAA tournament

References 

Notre Dame Fighting Irish
Notre Dame Fighting Irish
Notre Dame
Notre Dame Fighting Irish men's basketball seasons